Henry George Carroll,  (January 31, 1865 – August 20, 1939) was a Canadian politician, jurist and the 16th Lieutenant Governor of Quebec from 1929 to 1934 and the last anglophone to serve in that position to the present day.

Born in Kamouraska, Canada East to Michael Burke Carroll of Ireland and Marguerite Campbell of Scotland, Carroll studied law at Laval University, was called to the Quebec Bar in 1889, and was created a Queen's Counsel in 1899.

A Liberal, he was first elected to the House of Commons of Canada in 1891 representing Kamouraska and was re-elected in 1896 and 1900. He was appointed Solicitor General of Canada in 1902 and served until 1904 at a time when the position was not a cabinet office but was part of the ministry under the Minister of Justice. He left politics to become a judge in the Quebec Superior Court in 1904 and was appointed to the Court of King's Bench in 1908. In 1912 he served as chairman of Quebec's Royal Commission examining the alcohol trade and subsequently served as vice-president province's Quebec Liquor Commission (Commission des liqueurs du Québec) from 1921 to 1929 when he was appointed Lieutenant Governor of Quebec following the sudden death of Gouin.

Carroll died in Quebec and was buried in his home town of Kamouraska in 1939. He was survived by wife Boulanger Malvine-Amazelie and two daughters Margaret Carroll and Juliette Carroll.

References
 
 Henry George CARROLL at Assemblée nationale du Québec 

1865 births
1939 deaths
Liberal Party of Canada MPs
Lieutenant Governors of Quebec
Members of the House of Commons of Canada from Quebec
Judges in Quebec
Lawyers in Quebec
Canadian King's Counsel
Université Laval alumni
People from Bas-Saint-Laurent
Solicitors General of Canada
Canadian people of Scottish descent
Canadian people of Irish descent